Sordide Sentimental is a French record label, founded in 1978 by Jean-Pierre Turmel and Yves Von Bontee, notable for its releases of early works by Joy Division, Throbbing Gristle, Psychic TV and others.

Artists 
 Monte Cazazza
 Davie Allan & The Arrows
 Durutti Column
 Grrzzz
 Joy Division
 Krackhouse
 Martyn Bates (Eyeless in Gaza)
 Psychic TV
 Rosa Crux
 The Red Crayola
 Savage Republic
 Steeple Remove
 Throbbing Gristle
 Problemist
 Tuxedomoon
 Private Circus (Scott MacLeay)
 The Bizarros

References

External links 
 https://web.archive.org/web/20110208120510/http://sordide-sentimental.com/

French record labels
Industrial record labels
1978 establishments in France